Cade's County is a modern-day Western/crime drama which aired Sundays at 9:30 pm (EST) on CBS during the 1971–1972 television season. There were 24 episodes.

Synopsis
Cade's County starred well-known Hollywood actor Glenn Ford as Sam Cade, the sheriff of the fictional Madrid County, a vast and sparsely populated desert area that was apparently located well inland in the American Southwest. The state in which it was located was never mentioned; it could have been California (where much of the location filming took place), Utah, Nevada, New Mexico or Arizona. Cade made occasional references to going to "Capitol City" for hearings and meetings. There is a town named Madrid, New Mexico, however, it is pronounced "MAD-rid", and is not a county seat.

Cade's character was complex and interesting, though never fully developed. He came from a socially prominent and well-to-do family in the county, had served in the U.S. Navy as a fighter pilot — there was one reference to the Korean War — and had been an FBI agent, after which he returned to Madrid County to become sheriff. There were no references to a wife or close family in the series.

His chief deputy was J. J. Jackson, portrayed by the character actor Edgar Buchanan.  While Cade had traveled the world, and had modern law enforcement training, Jackson had apparently spent most of his life and career in Madrid County.  Writers avoided the stereotypical combination of "resistant-to-change veteran" and "newly hatched expert" – Jackson was a capable and competent right-hand man, Cade firmly in control but trusted by his people, who called him "Sam".

Together they fought to maintain law and order against violent miners, cattle thieves and other lawbreakers who, for the most part, would have seemed at home in Westerns set in any era.  Cade usually drove a Jeep CJ-5, as many of the roads in his jurisdiction were apparently little more than tracks across the sand.

Several of the characters, including some of Cade's deputies, were Native Americans.  Another deputy was played by Ford's son, Pete (also the name of his character).

After summer hiatus, Cade's County was replaced in the 1972–1973 fall TV season by the hugely successful TV series M*A*S*H. Several episodes of Cade's County were released together in 1991 on VHS format under the title Sam Cade — Marshal of Madrid.  A two-part episode, Slay Ride, was released as a television feature film, occasionally broadcast by independent television stations.

The musical theme for the show was composed by Henry Mancini.  The title music appeared in an expanded version in the album Big Screen, Little Screen.

Cast
 Glenn Ford as Sheriff Sam Cade
 Edgar Buchanan as Senior Deputy J.J. Jackson
 Taylor Lacher as Arlo Pritchard
 Victor Campos as Rudy Davillo
 Peter Ford as Deputy Pete
 Sandra Ego as Joanie Little Bird
 Betty Ann Carr as Betty Ann Sundown

Episodes

References 
Brooks, Tim and Marsh, Earle, The Complete Directory to Prime Time Network and Cable TV Shows

External links 

CBS original programming
Television series by 20th Century Fox Television
1970s American drama television series
1971 American television series debuts
1972 American television series endings
1970s Western (genre) television series
English-language television shows
Television shows set in California
Neo-Western television series